Chandler is an unincorporated community in Wayne Township, Jefferson County, Ohio, United States.

The Chandler Post Office was established on April 16, 1921 and discontinued December 31, 1932. Mail service is now handled through the Bloomingdale branch. As of 1949, the Pittsburgh and West Virginia Railway was operating a freight terminal here.

References

Unincorporated communities in Jefferson County, Ohio